Sandra Laugier is a French philosopher, who works on moral philosophy, political philosophy, philosophy of language, gender studies, and popular culture. She is a full professor of philosophy (classe exceptionnelle, University professor) at the University of Paris 1 Panthéon-Sorbonne and a Senior member of the Institut Universitaire de France. She currently serves as the deputy director of the Institut des sciences juridique et philosophique de la Sorbonne (Université Paris 1 Panthéon-Sorbonne/CNRS). In 2014, she received the title of the Chevalier de la Légion d’honneur. In 2022, she was awarded the Grand prix Moron from the Académie française.

Laugier received Habilitation à Diriger des Recherches from the Université Paris I Panthéon-Sorbonne (1997) and PhD from Paris-Sorbonne University (1990). She was a visiting graduate student at Harvard University and an undergraduate student at the Ecole Normale Supérieure. 

Laugier has held several positions at the Centre National de la Recherche Scientifique (CNRS), including Deputy Director of the Division for Humanities and Social Sciences (INSHS) from 2010 to 2017 and a Special Adviser “Science in Society” to the President of CNRS from 2016 to 2017. One of the founders of the Institut du Genre at the CNRS, Laugier served as its President from 2012 to 2018 and as the President of the Scientific Council from 2018 to 2022. She has also served as an expert for the European Commission and as a panelist for the European Research Council (ERC).

Laugier is the author of numerous publications on ordinary language philosophy (Ludwig Wittgenstein, John L. Austin), moral philosophy (moral perfectionism, ethics of care), American philosophy (Stanley Cavell, Henry David Thoreau, Ralph Waldo Emerson), gender studies, popular culture (TV series), and, more recently, on democracy and civil disobedience. She is the French translator of most of Stanley Cavell’s work.

Laugier has taught at various universities around the world, including as a Visiting Professor at Toronto University (2022), Boston University (2019) and at Sapienza University of Rome (2019), a Visiting Research Fellow at the Max Planck Institute (Berlin), Distinguished Visiting Professor at Johns Hopkins University, Visiting Professor at Pontifical University (Lima), and Visiting Professor “Chaire invitée” at the Facultés Saint-Louis (Bruxelles).

Since 2019, she has been the principal investigator of the ERC programme Demoseries devoted to the philosophy of TV series.

Laugier is an editor of two book series: TV-Philosophy, published by Exeter Press (with Robert Sinnerbrink and Martin Shuster) and Philoséries, published by Vrin (with Sylvie Allouche).

She is member of Editorial/ Scientific Board of Archives de Philosophie, and British Journal for the History of Philosophy, Iride, Revue de Métaphysique et de Morale, Multitudes, Espace Temps.

Laugier is also a columnist at the French journal Libération.

Bibliography

Books
 L'Anthropologie logique de Quine, Paris, Vrin, 1992
 Recommencer la philosophie: La philosophie américaine aujourd'hui, Paris, PUF, 1999 (new enlarged edition, Vrin, 2014)
 Du réel à l'ordinaire: Quelle philosophie du langage aujourd'hui ?, Paris, Vrin, 1999 (translated in English, The University of Chicago Press, 2013)
 Faut-il encore écouter les intellectuels?, Paris, Bayard, 2003
 Une autre pensée politique américaine: La démocratie radicale, de R. W. Emerson à S. Cavell, Paris, Michel Houdiard, 2004
 Qu'est-ce que le care? (with Patricia Paperman and Pascale Molinier), Paris, Payot, 2009
 Wittgenstein: Les sens de l'usage, Paris, Vrin, 2009
 Wittgenstein: Le mythe de l’inexpressivité, Paris, Vrin, 2010
 Pourquoi désobéir en démocratie? (with Albert Ogien), Paris, La Découverte, 201010
 Why We Need Ordinary Language Philosophy, Chicago, The University of Chicago Press, 2013
 Face aux désastres: Une conversation à quatre voix sur la folie, le care et les grandes détresses collectives (with Anne M. Lovell, Stefania Pandolfo, Veena Das), Paris, Ithaque, 2013
 Le Principe démocratie (with Albert Ogien), Paris, La Découverte, 2014
 Recommencer la philosophie: Stanley Cavell et la philosophie en Amérique, Paris, Vrin, 2014
 Etica e politica dell'ordinario, Milano, LED Edizioni, 2015
 Antidémocratie, (with Albert Ogien), Paris, La Découverte, 2017
 Nos vies en series, Paris, Climats, 2019
 La société des vulnérables. Leçons féministes d’une crise (with Najat Vallaud-Belkacem), Paris, Gallimard, 2020
 Politics of the Ordinary. Care, Ethics, and Forms of Life, Leuven, Peeters, 2020
 La société des vulnérables (with Najat Vallaud-Belkacem), Gallimard, 2020
 Eloge de l’ordinaire, entretiens avec Philippe Petit, Le Cerf, 2021
 En confinement/La seconde vague des séries féministes, AOC livres, 2021
 Reinventer l’espace public (with Yves Cohen, Nilüfer Göle, and Richard Rechtman), CNRS editions, 2022
 TV-Philosophy: How TV Series Change Our Thinking, Exeter Press, 2023
 TV-Philosophy in Action: The Ethics and Politics of TV Series, Exeter Press, 2023

Edited books
 Physique et réalité (coedited with Michel Bitbol), Paris, éditions Diderot, Paris, 1997
 Les mots de l’esprit: Wittgenstein et la philosophie de la psychologie (coedited with Christiane Chauviré and Jean-Jacques Rosat), Paris, Vrin, 2001
 Carnap et la construction logique du monde, Paris, Vrin, 2001
 Stanley Cavell, cinéma et philosophie (coedited with Marc Cerisuelo), Paris, Presses de la Sorbonne Nouvelle, 2001
 Wittgenstein: Métaphysique et jeu de langage, Paris, PUF, 2001
 Wittgenstein, dernières pensées (coedited with Jacques Bouveresse and Jean-Jacques Rosat), Marseille, Agone, 2002
 Husserl et Wittgenstein: De la description de l’expérience à la phénoménologie linguistique (coedited with Jocelyn Benoist), Hildesheim, Olms, 2004
 Textes-clés de philosophie des sciences (coedited with Pierre Wagner), 2 volumes, Paris, Vrin, 2004
 Langage ordinaire et métaphysique – Strawson (coedited with Jocelyn Benoist), Paris, Vrin, 2005
 Dictionnaire de la pornographie (coedited with Philippe Di Folco), Paris, PUF, 2005
 Le souci des autres – éthique et politique du care (coedited with Patricia Paperman), Paris, Éditions de l’EHESS, 2006
 L’ordinaire et le politique (coedited with Claude Gautier), Paris, PUF, 2006
 Ethique, littérature, vie humaine, Paris, PUF, 2006
 Lire les Recherches Philosophiques de Wittgenstein (coedited with Christiane Chauviré), Paris, Vrin, 2006
 Comment penser l'autonomie? Entre compétences et dépendances (coedited with Marlène Jouan), Paris, PUF, 2008
 Normativités du sens commun (coedited with Claude Gautier), Paris, PUF, 2009
 Textes-clés de philosophie du langage (coedited with Bruno Ambroise), 2 volumes, Paris, Vrin, 2009, 2010
 La voix et la vertu: Variétés du perfectionnisme moral, Paris, PUF, 2010
 J. L. Austin et la philosophie du langage ordinaire (coedited with Christophe Al-Saleh), Hildesheim, Olms, 2011
 Tous vulnérables? Ethique du care, les animaux et l'environnement, Paris, Payot, 2012
 La philosophie analytique (coedited with Sabine Plaud), Paris, Ellipses, 2012
 Philoséries: Buffy – Tueuse de vampires (coedited with Sylvie Allouche), Paris, Bragelonne, 2014
 Formes de vie (coedited with Estelle Ferrarese), CNRS éditions, 2018
 Le pouvoir des liens faibles (coedited with Alexandre Gefen), CNRS éditions, 2020
 Concepts de l’ordinaire (coedited with Pierre Fasula), éditions de la Sorbonne, 2021
 Perlocutoire (coedited with Daniele Lorenzini), éditions Mare et Martin, 2021
 Des enjeux publics de la pandémie (coedited with Christine Noiville and Xavier Philippe), éditions Mare et Martin, 2021
 Cavell’s Must We Mean What We Say? at Fifty (coedited with Juliet Floyd et Greg Chase), Cambridge University Press, 2022
 Les usages de l’usage (coedited with Béatrice Godart-Wendling), ISTE, Londres, 2022 
 24h chrono. Aux origines du genre sécuritaire (coedited with Sylvie Allouche), Vrin, open access, 2022
 Séries TV, laboratoire d’éveil politique, CNRS Editions, Paris 2023
 Television With Stanley Cavell in Mind (coedited with David LaRocca), Exeter Press, 2023

Edited special journal issues 
 "Retour du moralisme ?" (coedited with Laurent Jaffro), Cités, 2001
 "Moritz Schlick et le tournant de la philosophie", Etudes Philosophiques, 2001
 "Wittgenstein 1889-1951", Archives de philosophie, 2001
 "Ralph Waldo Emerson: L’autorité du scepticisme", Revue Française d’Etudes Américaines, 2002
 "Naturalisme(s): Héritages contemporains de Hume", Revue de métaphysique et de morale, 2003
 "Politiques de la pornographie" (coedited with Michela Marzano), Cités, 2003
 "Après la structure: Kuhn et les révolutions scientifiques", Archives de philosophie, 2003
 "Usages d’Austin" (coedited with Isabelle Thomas-Fogiel), Revue de métaphysique et de morale, 2004
 "Morale et métaphysique chez G.E. Moore" (coedited with Emmanuel Picavet), Revue de métaphysique et de morale, 2006
 "La contrainte", Actes de savoirs. Revue de l'IUF, 2007
 "Quine et l'analyticité", Archives de philosophie, 2009
 "Wittgenstein politique" (coedited with Marie-Anne Lescourret), Cités, 2009
 "Politiques du care" (coedited with Pascale Molinier), Multitudes, 2009
 "Perfectionism, Transcendentalism, Pragmatism" (coedited with Piergiorgio Donatelli), European Journal of Pragmatism and American Philosophy, 2011
 "Grammaires de la vulnérabilité" (coedited with Marie Gaille), Raison Publique, 2011
 "Stanley Cavell", Revue internationale de philosophie, 2011
 "Le retour à la vie ordinaire", Raison Publique, 2013
 "Care and Human Security", Iride, 2013
 "Care, catastrophe, capabilités", Raison Publique, 2014
 "Genre et environnement", Cahiers du Genre, 2015
 "New Robotics, New Living Beings", Iride, 2016
 "L'invention des formes de vie", Multitudes, no 71, 2018
 "Le patriarcat bouge encore", Multitudes, no 78, 2020

Translations 
 S. Cavell, Une nouvelle Amérique encore inapprochable, de Wittgenstein à Emerson (This New Yet Unapproachable America), Combas, L’éclat, 1991
 S. Cavell, Statuts d’Emerson: Constitution, philosophie, politique, the volume includes a presentation and translation of Cavell's and Emerson's essays, Combas, L’éclat, 1992
 S. Cavell, A la recherche du bonheur: Hollywood et la comédie du remariage (Pursuits of Happiness), Paris, Cahiers du Cinéma, 1993 (with Christian Fournier)
 S. Cavell, Conditions nobles et ignobles: La constitution du perfectionnnisme moral émersonien (Conditions Handsome and Unhandsome), Combas, L’éclat, 1993 (with Christian Fournier)
 S. Cavell, Les Voix de la raison (The Claim of Reason), Paris, Seuil, 1996 (with Nicole Balso)
 A. Gibbard, Sagesse des choix, justesse des sentiments: Une théorie du judgement normatif (Wise Choices, Apt Feelings), Paris, PUF, 1996
 S. Cavell, Un ton pour la philosophie (A Pitch of Philosophy), Paris, Bayard, 2003 (with Elise Domenach)
 W. V. Quine, D’un point de vue logique (From a Logical Point of View), Paris, Vrin, 2003 (collective translation)
 R. W. Emerson, Essais: Histoire, Destin, Expérience, Compensation, Paris, Michel Houdiard, 2005 (with Christian Fournier)
 S. Cavell, Dire et vouloir dire (Must We Mean What We Say?), Paris, Éditions du Cerf, 2009 (with Christian Fournier)
 S. Cavell, Qu'est-ce que la philosophie américaine?, Paris, Folio Gallimard, 2009 (with Christian Fournier)
 S. Cavell, Si j'avais su… (Little Did I Know), Paris, Éditions du Cerf, 2014 (with Jean-Louis Laugier)

Articles 
 Several publications and papers available on the author's Academia page
 Several papers available on the author's personal website
 Her recent publications and broadcasts are announced on the author's facebook page

Papers in English available online 
 "This is us. Wittgenstein and the social", 2012
 "Necrology of Ontology: Putnam, Ethics, Realism", The Monist, volume 103, issue 4, October 2020, pages 391–403
 "Disobedience as Resistance to Intellectual Conformity", Critical Inquiry 45, 2019
 "The Vulnerabiliy of the Ordinary: Goffman, reader of Austin", 2018
 "Voice as Form of Life and Life Form", 2015
 "The Normativity of the Ordinary: Performative Utterances and Social Reality"
 "A Romanticism of Democracy: Emerson, Thoreau, Cavell, Malick"
 "Popular Cultures, Ordinary Criticism: A Philosophy of Minor Genres", MLN Journal | Johns Hopkins University Press, 2012
 "Introduction to the French edition of Must We Mean What We Say?", Critical Inquiry, vol. 37 (2011), no. 4, pp. 627–651
 "The Will to See", Graduate Faculty Philosophy Journal, vol. 34 (2013), no. 2, pp. 263–281
 "The Ethics of Care as a Politics of the Ordinary"
 Interview with Sandra Laugier and Albert Ogien on civil disobedience
 Notes on Stanley Cavell

In French 
 Sandra Laugier's publications on Cairn.info
 Sandra Laugier's articles in Libération
 Sandra Laugier's articles in Mediapart
 Sandra Laugier's articles in Multitudes

References

1961 births
20th-century anthropologists
20th-century educational theorists
20th-century educators
20th-century French historians
20th-century French philosophers
20th-century French women writers
20th-century linguists
20th-century social scientists
20th-century translators
21st-century anthropologists
21st-century educational theorists
21st-century educators
21st-century French historians
21st-century French philosophers
21st-century French women writers
21st-century linguists
21st-century social scientists
21st-century translators
Analytic philosophers
Communication theorists
École Normale Supérieure alumni
Environmental philosophers
Environmental sociologists
Environmental writers
Epistemologists
Feminist criticism
Feminist ethicists
Feminist philosophers
Feminist theorists
Film theorists
French anthropologists
French democracy activists
French educational theorists
French educators
French ethicists
French logicians
French scholars
French semioticians
French sociologists
French translators
French women non-fiction writers
French women philosophers
Historians of philosophy
Husserl scholars
Linguistic turn
Linguists from France
Literacy and society theorists
Living people
Mass media theorists
Metaphysicians
Metaphysics writers
Ontologists
Ordinary language philosophy
Academic staff of Paris-Sorbonne University
Philosophers of art
Philosophers of culture
Philosophers of education
Philosophers of history
Philosophers of language
Philosophers of linguistics
Philosophers of logic
Philosophers of mind
Philosophers of science
Philosophers of social science
Philosophers of technology
Philosophy academics
Political philosophers
Pragmaticists
Revolution theorists
Social commentators
Social philosophers
Social sciences writers
Theorists on Western civilization
Academic staff of the University of Paris
Wittgensteinian philosophers
Women educational theorists
Writers about activism and social change
Writers about globalization
Research directors of the French National Centre for Scientific Research
Academic staff of the University of Picardy Jules Verne